Thomas Howe (born 17 September 1944) is a Liberian middle-distance runner. He competed in the men's 800 metres at the 1972 Summer Olympics.

References

1944 births
Living people
Athletes (track and field) at the 1972 Summer Olympics
Liberian male middle-distance runners
Olympic athletes of Liberia
Place of birth missing (living people)